Mercer is an English and Scottish surname. It is an occupational name, derived from the Old French word "mercier" or "merchier", meaning a merchant: originally one trading in textiles (mercery).

People

Academics 
Alison Mercer (born 1954), New Zealand zoologist 
Asa Mercer, first president of the Territorial University of Washington and a member of the Washington State Senate 
James Mercer (mathematician), English mathematician
Roger Mercer, British archaeologist

Actors, performers, presenters and producers
Beryl Mercer, Spanish-born British actress
Bill Mercer, American sportscaster
Jack Mercer, American animator and voice actor
Marian Mercer, award-winning American actress
Matthew Mercer, American voice actor
Phil Mercer, radio presenter on the BBC
Rick Mercer, Canadian comedian, television personality and political satirist
Sam Mercer, film producer
William (Rosko) Mercer (1927–2000), known as Rosko, American news announcer and disc jockey

Athletes and sports personalities
Alex Mercer (footballer), Scottish footballer
Arthur Mercer (1902–1994), English footballer
Dawson Mercer (born 2001), Canadian ice hockey player
Gary Mercer, New Zealand rugby league footballer and coach
Joe Mercer, English football player and manager
Joe Mercer (jockey), English jockey
 LaVon Mercer (born 1959), American-Israeli basketball player
Leroy Mercer, American football player
Mike Mercer (basketball), American basketball player
Mike Mercer (American football), former American college and professional football player
Ray Mercer, American professional boxer, former WBO World Heavyweight Champion, Olympic gold medalist
Ron Mercer, American former basketball player at the University of Kentucky, in the National Basketball Association
Tommy Mercer, American professional wrestler
Win Mercer, pitcher in Major League Baseball from 1894 to 1902

Literary figures 
Cecil William Mercer (1885–1960), British novelist who wrote under the pseudonym of Dornford Yates
David Mercer (playwright), English playwright and dramatist
Jeremy Mercer, Canadian writer
Mick Mercer, journalist and author
William Mercer (poet) (c. 1605 – c. 1675), Scottish poet and army officer

Musicians 
Carey Mercer, Canadian indie singer-songwriter
James Mercer (musician), guitarist, lead singer and songwriter of the Shins
Jerry Mercer, former drummer for the Canadian rock groups April Wine and Mashmakhan
Johnny Mercer, American songwriter and singer 
Mabel Mercer, English-born cabaret singer
Vic Mercer, better known as "Celph Titled", American rapper

Politicians and civil servants 
Charles F. Mercer, nineteenth century U.S. politician from Virginia 
David Henry Mercer, Nebraska Republican politician
James Mercer, soldier, jurist, Virginia delegate to the Second Continental Congress
John Francis Mercer, American lawyer, planter, and politician from Virginia and Maryland
Johnny Mercer, British politician (Minister for Veterans 2019–2021), former army officer
Patrick Mercer, British politician, military novelist, former army officer 
William Thomas Mercer (1821–1879), British Colonial Secretary in Hong Kong, 1859–1868
William W. Mercer, United States Attorney for the District of Montana

Soldiers 
General Cavalié Mercer, British artillery officer and author of Journal of the Waterloo Campaign
Hugh Mercer, physician, brigadier general in the Continental Army and a close friend to George Washington
Hugh W. Mercer, officer in the United States Army and then a Confederate general during the American Civil War
Malcolm Mercer, Canadian general, barrister and art patron
Major Mercer of the Worcestershire horse, who played a prominent part on the Parliamentary side at the Battle of Worcester in 1651

Others
 George Mercer, rapist
 Henry Chapman Mercer, Pennsylvania archeologist, tile-maker, and designer of poured-concrete structures such as the Mercer Museum
 Henry Mercer (priest), Anglican clergyman and fraudster
 Lucy Mercer best known for her affair with Franklin Delano Roosevelt
 John Mercer (disambiguation)
 Rebekah Mercer, head of Mercer Family Foundation; daughter of Robert Mercer; 
 Robert Mercer (businessman) (born 1946), computer scientist and former co-CEO of Renaissance Technologies
 Robert Mercer (priest) (born 1935), English priest
 Ruth Sienkiewicz-Mercer, quadriplegic and American disability rights activist

Fictional characters
 Alex Mercer, a character in the Prototype (video game) game series published by Activision
 Alex Mercer, a character in Netflix's Julie and the Phantoms
Anton Mercer, a character in Power Rangers Dino Thunder
 Daniel Mercer, in the 6 Years film
 Gretchen Mercer, a character in Family Guy
 Owen Mercer, in the DC Universe
 Roy D. Mercer, fictional radio character
 Trent Fernandez-Mercer, the White Dino Thunder Power Ranger
 Wilbur Mercer, in Philip K. Dick's science fiction novel Do Androids Dream of Electric Sheep?
 Ed Mercer, in Seth MacFarlane's science-fiction television show The Orville
 Michael Mercer and Maxxine Mercer, characters in The Walking Dead
 Ian Mercer, in the Pirates of the Caribbean film series

References

English-language surnames
Surnames of English origin
Scottish surnames
Occupational surnames
English-language occupational surnames